Reuven Adiv (5 June 1930 – 23 December 2004) was a Jerusalem-born Israeli actor, director and drama teacher, most notable as the head of acting at the Drama Centre in London from 1984 to 2004.

Early life
Reuven Adiv was born in Jerusalem, British Mandate of Palestine (now Israel) on 5 June 1930, to a family of Ashkenazi Jewish background. He fought on the Jerusalem front against the British administration. His father was born in part of modern-day Belarus (then part of the Russian Empire), and died in a Nazi concentration camp.

Career
His early acting experience came at the Ohel Theatre and the Cameri Theater of Tel Aviv. He studied under Lee Strasberg at the Actors Studio in New York, where he also took the director's course. He also studied at the film school of New York University before returning to teach at the Lee Strasberg institute.

He returned to Tel Aviv, Israel, in 1971 and alongside stage and screen acting he was invited to teach at the Beit Zvi school of performing arts in Ramat Gan, Israel. In 1979 he was appointed principal of the theatre department of Seminar HaKibbutzim College.

In 1984, he was invited to become head of the acting department at the Drama Centre, London as a successor to Doreen Cannon, who had become head of acting at the Royal Academy of Dramatic Art (RADA).

"...the results emanate from within, owing nothing to make-up or setting..." – Reuven Adiv

From 1986 to 1996, he was a guest teacher at the Swedish State Theatre School, Gothenburg and from 2003 he taught at the Forum für Filmschauspiel in Berlin.

Notable students
Tom Hardy

 Morven Christie
 Benjamin Davies
 Colin Firth

 Tara Fitzgerald
 Ruta Gedmintas
 Martin Goeres

 Helen McCrory
 John Simm

Selected stage productions as director
 The Crucible, Drama Centre London (2003)
 Marya, Drama Centre London (2003)
 Paradise Lost, Drama Centre London (2002)
 This Happy Breed by Noël Coward, Drama Centre London (2002)
 Napoli Millionaria by Eduardo De Filippo, Drama Centre London (2001)
 Tartuffe, Drama Centre London (2000)
 The Seagull, Drama Centre London (1999)
 Six Characters in Search of an Author by Luigi Pirandello, Drama Centre London (n.d.)
 Ibsen's A Doll's House, Drama Centre London (n.d.)
 Spring Awakening, Drama Centre London (n.d.)
 Enemies, Drama Centre London (n.d.)
 Right You Are (If You Think You Are), Drama Centre London (n.d.)

Personal life
He married the Israeli actress and broadcaster Galia Nativ in 1980. They had two children, a daughter and a son, and lived in North London. He died of a heart attack in 2004, aged 74.

Filmography
 1976 Giv'at Halfon Eina Ona (English: Halfon Hill Doesn't Answer), directed by Assi Dayan, Israel – Cast member

See also
Method acting
Drama Centre London
Actors Studio
Beit Zvi

References

External links
Obituary at The Stage
Obituary at The Guardian
Portrait (B&W): Reuven Adiv

1930 births
2004 deaths
Artists from Jerusalem
Israeli Ashkenazi Jews
Israeli people of Belarusian-Jewish descent
Actors Studio alumni
Israeli male stage actors
Drama teachers
Israeli male film actors
Academics of the Drama Centre London
Male actors from Jerusalem
New York University alumni
Israeli expatriates in the United States
Israeli expatriates in the United Kingdom